Eliezer ben Samuel of Metz (died 1198) was a Tosafist and the author of the halachic work Sefer Yereim (Vilna 1892).  An abridgment of this work was produced by Benjamin ben Abraham Anaw.

See also
Moses ben Meir of Ferrara

References

 Finkel, Avraham Yaakov (1990). The Great Torah Commentators, Jason Aronson, Northvale, New Jersey.

External links
 

12th-century French rabbis
1198 deaths
Rabbis from Metz
French Tosafists
Year of birth unknown